The 1996 Brigham Young Cougars football team represented the Brigham Young University in the 1996 NCAA Division I-A football season. They were the first team during the so-called "Modern era" (post 1937) to play 15 games in a season, and the only one to do it when Division I-A teams normally played 11 regular season games. That allowed BYU to play 13 regular season games. They then played a conference championship game and a bowl game in the Cotton Bowl Classic bringing the total to 15 games.

During the 2002 and 2003 seasons teams were allowed to schedule 12 games as well as a "kickoff" game.  As a result, the 2003 Kansas State Wildcats became only the second team to play a 15-game season, finishing with an 11-4 record. The kickoff game exemption was eliminated in 2005, but the Hawaii exemption remains in place.

Since 2014, it has again been possible for teams to play a 15-game schedule without playing in Hawaii because of the 4 team playoff system. The next team to do this without the aid of the playoff would be the 2019 Hawaii Rainbow Warriors.

Schedule

Roster

References

BYU
BYU Cougars football seasons
Western Athletic Conference football champion seasons
Cotton Bowl Classic champion seasons
BYU Cougars football